Muhammad Yousuf Khushk, ( ALA-LC: born 1968) is chairman of the Pakistan Academy of Letters, Islamabad. He was formerly, Chairman department of Urdu, Director Student Affairs, Dean Faculty of Social sciences & Arts,  pro-vice chancellor of the Shah Abdul Latif University in Khairpur.

Citation 
Abstract: Dr. Muhammad Yousuf Khushk Meritorious Professor is presently working in MP-I
Scale, as a Chairman, Pakistan Academy of Letters, Islamabad and representative of Pakistan, for
world Atlas of Languages  headed by the UNESCO. He remained also a Member of  Presidential National
Award Committee, Member of the selection committee for Pakistan chairs situated in various
universities abroad , Member of  various  academic committees of HEC  Pakistan  and universities
of Pakistan and abroad.
He remained successful, Pro Vice Chancellor, Dean Faculty of Social Sciences , Arts & Languages,
Director Student Affairs , Chairman of the Department and has achieved two times best university
teacher award from HEC Pakistan.
He is   author, editor  and sole patron of  One hundred thirty(130) books.  More than one hundred
eighty  (180)  research Papers / Forewords of book and editorials of research Journals/ magazine are
at his account.
He has floated Twenty  six ( 26) international MoUs with different countries through proper
channel and from these six are reached at a fruitful stage and others are in the way of speedy
progress under his leadership. These endeavors have been  appreciated by the all related corners
More than two Hundred (200) International and National Conference, Seminars have been
organized by him/under his leadership. These conferences and seminars have been  inaugurated by
the President,  Prime Minster of Pakistan , Federal and provincial  Ministers, Literature lover
Politicians, bureaucrats,  Foreign Diplomats   and renowned writers of Pakistani literati and abroad
As the Chairman of the Pakistan  Academy of letters Dr, Khushk has entirely changed the
environment of the Academy by taking different initiatives. In the period of 44 years academy
published more than 500 books and in his 3 years period academy published 105 books. He has set
new trends by digitalizing all the publications and have made them available online for the readers
around the world. Thus, the Academy has  become the first  completely digitalized institute  of
Literature  in Pakistan. Presenting tribute to the renowned writers of Pakistan he materialized the
dream to establish the first Hall of Fame of literature  in Pakistan. The same was  inaugurated by the
Prime Minister of Pakistan.  In KPK  three story  building  for Provincial   office of the Academy at
Peshawar has been completed within the given time period has been made functional as well. He
has successfully got  the funds for  establishment of First Literary Museum of Pakistani Languages
 and   for the construction of the  three new regional offices of the Academy  at Gilgat, Muzafferaba
and Hyderabad.
Under his leadership the Pakistan Academy of letters celebrated the  Diamond Jublee of Pakistan
full  year in a  unique way , entitled as "75th year 75 programs" related with various languages
and fields of Pakistani literatures.   Not only the programs were conducted and their recordings
were ensured to be available  on social media but also simultaneously 30 research based books,
special issues of the magazine have  also been published related only with the Diamond jubilee of
Pakistan.  This documents the history of  Pakistani   literature  from 1947 to 2022.

Education 
Khushk attended high school in Hyderabad, Sindh, before completing a Bachelor of Arts at the University of Sindh, Jamshoro in 1986 and a Master of Arts in Urdu from the same institution in 1989. He has a PhD from Shah Abdul Latif University, Khairpur and undertook post doctoral research at the University of Heidelberg.

Research publications 
اردو زبان و ادب کی ترویج میں پاکستان اسٹڈی سینٹر جامعہ کراچی کا  حصہ, Almas Urdu  Research Journal Shah Abdul Latif University Khairpur, Vol.  20, 2018, pages 108- 124
سندھ یونیورسٹی جامشورو کے اساتذہ کی اردو خدمات ( قیام  سے1970 تک), Journal of  Research Urdu, B.Z University Multan, Vol.  30  Dec. 2016, pages 1–18
اکیسویں صدی میں معدوم ہونے  والی زبانیں: مسائل اور امکانات, Almas Urdu  Research Journal Shah Abdul Latif University Khairpur, Vol. 18 2016, pages 326 – 336
معاشرے کی تعمیر نو میں سندھی ادبا کا کردار, Almas Urdu  Research Journal Shah Abdul Latif University Khairpur, Vol. 17  2015–16, pages 380 – 392
افسانوی ادب میں خواتین قلم کاروں کا تاریخی و  تہذ یبی شعور, Almas Urdu Research  Journal Shah Abdul Latif University Khairpur, Vol. 15, 2013–14, *کثیر ثقافتیت، عالمگیریت، نسلیت  اور سرائیکی عوام, “Daryaft”  Research Journal National University of Modern Languages Islamabad, Vo.12, 2012, pages 168- 173
9-11  کے بعد کی دنیا   اور کلامﹺ فیض, Almas Urdu Research Journal Shah Abdul Latif University Khairpur, Vol. 13, 2011–12, pages 10–18
Baloch  Writer's Contribution in Urdu Travelogue, Me’yar, Urdu  Research Journal, International Islamic University Islamabad, Vol.7 2012, pages 413-442
ضرب کلیم: نظموں کے غیر مطبوعہ مخذوف مصرعے و اشعار, “Daryaft”  Research Journal National University of Modern Languages Islamabad, Vol. 11  2012, pages198- 232
 بال جبریل: غزلوں کے غیر مطبوعہ اور محذوف مصرعے, Journal of  Research Urdu, B.Z University Multan, Vol.  20 Dec. 2011, pages11-34
"اردو  افسانہ نگاری میں بلوچ اہل علم کی خدمات", Journal of  Research Urdu, B.Z University Multan, Vol.  20 Dec. 2011, pages 63–90
پاکستانی زبانوں کے کلاسیکی شعری ادب کی تدریس: ایک نیا تناظر, Me’yar, Urdu  Research Journal, International Islamic University Islamabad, Vol.  6, 2011, pages 44–50
 Combine Literary  movements of Urdu & Sindhi Literature, “Daryaft”  Research Journal National University of Modern Languages Islamabad, Vol. 10  2011, pages 268- 270
اسلامی معاشرہ  اکیسویں صدی اور پیغام اقبال, “Almas” Research  Journal Shah Abdul Latif University  Khairpur., Vol.12-2010-11, pages 224-230
 Role of Sindhi Language in National Identity, Journal of Research, Faculty  of Languages and Islamic  Studies Bahauddin Zakriya University Multan, Vol. 17 June 2010, pages 55–62
 قصص ہند اور  تاریخ نویسی کے تقاضے, International Conference Proceedings under title: آزاد  صدی مقالات Published by the University of Punjab Lahore, 2010, pages 227-236
قیام  پاکستان کے بعد سندھی بولنے والے ادیب اور اردو, “Daryaft”  Research Journal National University of Modern Languages Islamabad, Vol.9 Jan.2010, pages 249-256

Books 
 BOOKS PUBLISHED, UNDER PATRONAGE FROM MARCH 2020 to DATE  
 *
S. No,Title of Book,Period,Publishing Agency
 01 سہ ماہي ادبيات  ناول نمبر: اُردو ناول ڈيڑھ صدي کا قصہ(جلد اول و  دوم),شمارہ نمبر121-122 جولائي  تا دسمبر 201۹,Pakistan Academy of Letters *
 02 سہ ماہي ادبيات  ناول نمبر: اُردو ناول ڈيڑھ صدي کا قصہ (جلد اول و  دوم),شمارہ نمبر123-124جنوري تا جون2020ء,Pakistan Academy of Letters *
 03 ادبيات اطفال،,شمارہ نمبر12۔11اکتوبر 201۹ تا مارچ 2020,Pakistan Academy of Letters *
 04 ادبيات اطفال، ,شمارہ نمبر۔1۳اپريل تا جون 2020 ,Pakistan Academy of Letters *
 05 تابش دہلوي: شخصيت اور فن,2020,Pakistan Academy of Letters *
 06 امجد اسلام امجد: شخصيت اور فن,2020,Pakistan Academy of Letters *
 07 نقوي احمد پوري: شخصيت اور فن,2020,Pakistan Academy of Letters *
 08 سلطان سکون: شخصيت اور فن,2020,Pakistan Academy of Letters *
 09 سيد نصرت زيدي: شخصيت اور فن,2020,Pakistan Academy of Letters *
 10 ادبيات اطفال، ,شمارہ نمبر۔1۴جولائي تا ستمبر 2020,Pakistan Academy of Letters *
 11 70 Years of Pakistani Urdu Literature,2020,Pakistan Academy of Letters *
 12 سہ ماہي ‘‘ ادبيات’’,شمارہ نمبر (125) *
 13 سندھي افسانے,2020,Pakistan Academy of Letters *
 14 منتخب کہانياں، چنگيز آتماتوف,2020,Pakistan Academy of Letters *
 15 سيد عباس علي شاہ: شخصيت اور فن,2021,Pakistan Academy of Letters *
 16,نيپال کي آواز,2021,Pakistan Academy of Letters *
 17,اردو ترجمہ "لي ساو"Translation of Chinese Qu Yuan’s Poem “Li Sao” into Urdu ,2021,Pakistan Academy of Letters *
 18,ادبيات اطفال، شمارہ نمبر1۵۔1۶,اکتوبر2020تا مارچ2021,Pakistan Academy of Letters *
 19,غم کے محاذ پر ( چيني شاعر چُھويو آن کي طويل نظم کا اردو ترجمہ) ,2021ء,Pakistan Academy of Letters *
 20,منتخب پشتو افسانے,2021ء,Pakistan Academy of Letters *
 21,سيد ہاشم شاہؒ :شخصيت اور فن,2021ء,Pakistan Academy of Letters *
 22,ادبيات پنجاب           ( شمارہ نمبر(1),2021ء,Pakistan Academy of Letters *
 23,ادبيات سندھ             ( شمارہ نمبر(1),2021ء,Pakistan Academy of Letters *
 24,ادبيات بلوچستان        ( شمارہ نمبر(1),2021ء,Pakistan Academy of Letters *
 25,ادبيات خيبر پختونخواہ  ( شمارہ نمبر(1),2021ء,Pakistan Academy of Letters *
 26,آصف ثاقب : شخصيت اور فن ,2021ء,Pakistan Academy of Letters *
 27,سہ ماہي‘‘ ادبيات’’ شمارہ نمبر (12۷۔12۶),2021ء,Pakistan Academy of Letters *
 28,منتخب سرائيکي افسانے ,2021ء,Pakistan Academy of Letters *
 29,خالي کرسياں ( يوجين آئنسکو کے شہرہ آفاق ڈرامےThe Chairs کا ترجمہ),اکتوبر 2020تا مارچ 2021,Pakistan Academy of Letters *
 30,سيد تقويم الحق کا کا خيل: شخصيت اور فن,2021ء,Pakistan Academy of Letters *
 31,آغا سليم : شخصيت اور فن,2021ء,Pakistan Academy of Letters *
 32,رزنا مہ گلگاميش (  نينسي کے سينڈرز) ترجمہ ، تحقيق و تجزيہ,2021ء,Pakistan Academy of Letters *
 33,ڈاکٹر تحسين فراقي:  شخصيت اور فن ( تخليق کار، محقق، نقاد) از : طارق ہاشمي,2021ء,Pakistan Academy of Letters *
 34,Pakistani Literature ( Special Issue) Pakistani Short Stories, Vol-21 Issue 1-2                          ,2021ء,Pakistan Academy of Letters *
 35,ادبيات اطفال، شمارہ نمبر1۷,2021ء,Pakistan Academy of Letters *
 36,پروفيسر جليل عالي: شخصيت اور فن ( شاعر) از : خاور اعجاز,2021ء,Pakistan Academy of Letters *
 37,محمد حفيظ خان: شخصيت اور فن ( افسانہ ، ڈرامہ، ناول نگار، مقق، نقاد، مترجم) از خورشيد رباني,2021ء,Pakistan Academy of Letters *
 38,ڈاکٹر داود رہبر: شخصيت اور فن ( شاعر ، محقق، نقاد) از: ڈاکٹر نوشين صفدر),2021ء,Pakistan Academy of Letters *
 39,استور ميں اُردو ( زبان و ادب کا ارتقا) از: ڈاکٹر سجاد علي رئيسي، منيرہ سجاد رئيسي,2021ء,Pakistan Academy of Letters *
 40,خوف کے آس پاس    ترتيب و تہذيب: ڈاکٹر ارشد محمود ناشاد,2021ء,Pakistan Academy of Letters *
 41,Sorrows of SARASVATI, The Lost River , Mustansar Hussain Tarar, Translated by Safeer Awan                                                ,2021ء,Pakistan Academy of Letters *
 42,Feminine Foot Print on Pakistani Literature ( Selected Stories of Female Writers of  Pakistan Pakistan) ,,2021ء,Pakistan Academy of Letters *
 43,منتخب کھوار کہانياں۔    تدوين و ترتيب: ڈاکٹر بادشاہ منير بخاري,2021ء,Pakistan Academy of Letters *
 44,منتخب گاوري کہانياں۔  تاليف وترجمہ: ڈاکٹر نقيب احمد جان,2021ء,Pakistan Academy of Letters *
 45,پاکستاني زبانيں اور بولياں,2021ء,Pakistan Academy of Letters *
 46,جرمني کي منتخب کہانياں، مترجمين: امتہ المنان طاہر  /آريان ہوپف/عليم احمد طاہر,2021ء,Pakistan Academy of Letters *
 47,کينيڈا کي منتخب کہانياں ۔  مترجم : روبينہ فيصل ,2021ء,Pakistan Academy of Letters *
 48,فن لينڈ کي منتخب کہانياں۔ مترجم ارشد فاروق,2021ء,Pakistan Academy of Letters *
 49,سہہ ماہي ادبيات ۔  شمارہ نمبر(12۸) اپريل تا جون 2021 ,2021ء,Pakistan Academy of Letters *
 50,ڈاکٹرنجيب جمال:  شخصيت اور فن ( تنقيد نگار) از: شفيق الرحمان الہٰ آبادي,2021ء,Pakistan Academy of Letters *
 51,علامہ آئي آئي قاضي  : شخصيت اور فن  ( دانشور/ ماہر تعليم) از ڈاکٹر عبدالغفار سومرو,2021ء,Pakistan Academy of Letters *
 52,ڈاکٹر ايوب صا بر:  شخصيت اور فن ( ماہر اقباليات) از محمد زمان معظم,2021ء,Pakistan Academy of Letters *
 53,Blooming buds( English Translation of Selected Urdu Stories by the writers under the age of fifty ) Translated by: Mujadid- ul- Arz ,2021ء,Pakistan Academy of Letters *
 54,پاک سر زمين شاد باد ( ملي اور قومي شاعري کا انتخاب) مرتب: خورشيد رباني,2021ء,Pakistan Academy of Letters *
 55,فارسي ادب ميں محمد تقي مير کي خدمات ( تحقيقي و تنقيدي جائزہ)  از ڈاکٹر شہاب الدين ثاقب,2021ء,Pakistan Academy of Letters *
 56,جناب اشتياق احمد : شخصيت اور فن ( ماہر ادبيات اطفال) از: فاروق احمد,2021ء,Pakistan Academy of Letters *
 57,خالد احمد: شخصيت اور فن ( شاعر)  از: نعمان منظور,2021ء,Pakistan Academy of Letters *
 58,برازيل کي منتخب کہانياں         ۔     مترجم : محمد فيصل ,2021ء,Pakistan Academy of Letters *
 59,منتخب کشميري کہانياں ( ترجمہ و ترتيب) غلام  حسين بٹ,2021ء,Pakistan Academy of Letters *
 60,ادبيات اطفال ( ڈائمنڈ جوبلي، حصہ اول شمارہ 1۸ ,2021ء,Pakistan Academy of Letters *
 61,اقبال اور افغان اہل قلم           تاليف و ترجمہ:    ڈاکٹر نقيب احمد جان,2021ء,Pakistan Academy of Letters *
 62,غلام نبي راہي: شخيصت اور فن      ۔                                ڈاکٹر وحيد زہير,2021ء,Pakistan Academy of Letters *
 63,امريکہ کي منتخب کہانياں ۔    مترجمين: محمد شيراز دستي/ عميرہ عليم,2022ء,Pakistan Academy of Letters *
 64,ناروے کي منتخب کہانياں۔   مترجم ساکئستہ حسن,2022ء,Pakistan Academy of Letters *
 65,پوٹھواري ادب کي تاريخ   ( 1۹۴۷تا حال)  از: شيراز طاہر,2022ء,Pakistan Academy of Letters *
 66,براہوئ ادب کي تاريخ (1۹۴۷تا حال) از: عارف ضيا),2022ء,Pakistan Academy of Letters *
 67,ادبيات خيبر پختونخواہ ( ڈائمنڈ جوبلي نمبر)  شمارہ ۔2,2022ء,Pakistan Academy of Letters *
 68,منتخب ہندکو افسانے۔   انتخاب و ترجمہ:  سيد ماجد شاہ,2022ء,Pakistan Academy of Letters *
 69,منتخب بلتي کہانياں ۔   انتخاب و ترجمہ: احسان علي دانش,2022ء,Pakistan Academy of Letters *
 70,پاکستان ميں اردو غزل  ( حصہ اول) خاور اعجاز,2022ء,Pakistan Academy of Letters *
 71,توصيف تبسم (شخصيت اور فن)  ڈاکٹر شير علي,2022ء,Pakistan Academy of Letters *
 72,ادبيات بلوچستان ( ڈائمنڈ جوبلي نمبر) شمارہ نمبر(2),2022ء,Pakistan Academy of Letters *
 73,منتخب بلوچي کہانياں( 1۹۴۷تا حال)   انتخاب و ترجمہ: فضل بلوچ,2022ء,Pakistan Academy of Letters *
 74,ڈاکٹر خليل طوقار۔شخصيت اور فن                         از : ڈاکٹر اشرف کمال ,2022ء,Pakistan Academy of Letters *
 75,ڈاکٹر سعادت سعيد۔ شخصيت اور فن از : رباب تبسم,2022ء,Pakistan Academy of Letters *
 76,سغير ملال۔  شخصيت اور فن                        از : محمد فيصل,2022ء,Pakistan Academy of Letters *
 77,جديد ترکي افسانہ۔ از: ڈاکٹر خليل طوقار/ ثمينہ طوقار,2022ء,Pakistan Academy of Letters *
 78,سہہ ماہي ‘‘ادبيات ’’ شمارہ 129-130 (ڈائمنڈ جوبلي نمبر۔1),2022ء,Pakistan Academy of Letters *
 79, مرزا حامد بيگ: شخصيت اور فن   از :ڈاکٹر کاشف عرفان,2022ء,Pakistan Academy of Letters *
 80,بلوچي ادب کي تاريخ 1947 تا حال۔    از : پناہ بلوچ,2022ء,Pakistan Academy of Letters *
 81,پاکستان ميں اُردو ناول 1947 تا حال۔ انتخاب و تجزيہ : رفاقت حيات,2022ء,Pakistan Academy of Letters *
 82, Rising Star مترجم: فضل بلوچ,2022ء,Pakistan Academy of Letters'' *

References 

http://pal.gov.pk/files/chairman/cv.doc
http://dlp.gov.pk/

1968 births
Living people
Academic staff of Shah Abdul Latif University